"Sun Comes Up" is a song by English drum and bass band Rudimental, featuring British singer-songwriter James Arthur, released on 30 June 2017 through Asylum Records and East West Records as the lead single from the band's third studio album Toast to Our Differences (2018). It was written and produced by Kesi Dryden, Leon Rolle, Piers Aggett, Amir Amor and Cass Lowe. 

"Sun Comes Up" peaked at number 6 in the UK Singles Chart, and charted moderately in several other countries.

Background
The band said in a statement that the song is about overcoming adversity. "We're so excited to announce our new single Sun Comes Up, a song we wrote about overcoming adversity. We spent a long time looking for the right singer for it, and were close to giving up until we met James Arthur, he sang it and we were blown away. We aren't afraid of taking new directions, and our new material has stepped up to another level. We've travelled the world far and wide and finally we feel like we've returned home on this album." "We wanted to work with him [James Arthur] from the first time we saw him on TV. We didn't care where he came from. We thought his voice was amazing, unique," Rudimental told London Evening Standard. Kesi Dryden of Rudimental said that the song is about "a relationship breakup and how there is a new day when the sun comes up". "But when James heard the song he said the message he got from it was there has been a lot of negative times in the past but when the sun comes up it is a new day, you have a new chance. There was a new lease of life he got from it."

Critical reception
Robin Murray of Clash magazine described the song as "fusing underground sounds with some of the freshest pop hooks in the land". "James Arthur voices new single 'Sun Goes Up', and it's summertime feel is much-needed following a few dark weeks for the capital." Philippine Daily Inquirer wrote: "'Sun Comes Up' is a touching glimpse into how they've grown, both as individuals and as a band, and the various struggles they have been through to overcome adversity to get where they are today." Katrina Rees of CelebMix wrote: "The track opens with a gentle melody before an infectious beat kicks in which complements James' vocals. The chorus is euphoric and tinged with steel drums which creates the perfect summer atmosphere. We can already imagine that this song will be electric live and we can't wait to bop along to it at future festivals."

Track listing
Digital download
"Sun Comes Up" (featuring James Arthur) – 3:52

Digital download
"Sun Comes Up" (Steel Banglez Remix) (featuring James Arthur and MIST) – 3:51

Digital download
"Sun Comes Up" (Acoustic) (featuring James Arthur) – 4:15

Digital download
"Sun Comes Up" (Heyder Remix) (featuring James Arthur) – 4:10

Digital download
"Sun Comes Up" (Tritonal Remix) (featuring James Arthur) – 4:13

Digital download – Remixes, Pt. 1
"Sun Comes Up" (Offaiah Remix) (featuring James Arthur) – 3:13
"Sun Comes Up" (Ofenbach Remix) (featuring James Arthur) – 3:10
"Sun Comes Up" (Coldabank Remix) (featuring James Arthur) – 4:16
"Sun Comes Up" (Leon Lour Remix) (featuring James Arthur) – 3:56

Digital download – Remixes, Pt. 2
"Sun Comes Up" (Steel Banglez Remix) (featuring James Arthur and MIST) – 3:51
"Sun Comes Up" (Murdock Remix) (featuring James Arthur) – 3:51
"Sun Comes Up" (Distinkt Remix) (featuring James Arthur) – 3:29
"Sun Comes Up" (House of Mizchif Remix) (featuring James Arthur) – 6:43

Credits and personnel
Credits adapted from Tidal.
 Piers Aggett – composing, producing, background vocals, piano, synthesizer
 Amir Amor – composing, producing, background vocals, drum programming, guitar
 Cass Lowe – composing, producing, background vocals
 Kesi Dryden – composing, producing, background vocals, bass, strings
 Leon "Locksmith" Rolle – composing, producing, keyboard, background vocals, percussion
 Stuart Hawkes – mastering engineering
 Dave Emery – mixing
 Michael Freeman – mixing
 Spike Stent – mixing

Charts

Weekly charts

Year-end charts

Certifications

References

2017 singles
2017 songs
James Arthur songs
Rudimental songs
Song recordings produced by Rudimental
Songs written by Amir Amor
Songs written by Cass Lowe
Asylum Records singles
East West Records singles